Frigyes Hollósi may refer to:

 Frigyes Hollósi (actor) (1941–2012), Hungarian actor
 Frigyes Hollósi (sportsman) (1906–1979), Hungarian swimmer and rower